A national third tier of Scottish league football was first established in the 1923–24 season as Division Three, but it only lasted for two full seasons due to the costs of meeting match guarantees and travel and other expenses being beyond most member clubs' capacity to pay. 

As a result, the third-tier league was dissolved, and would not be re-established until 1946–47 with the C Division, which also included reserve teams of the clubs from the divisions above. Division C operated as a national competition for the first three seasons; thereafter, it was split into two regional sections until season 1954–55, when the third tier was again dissolved.

The third tier was re-established in 1975–76 season, when a division known as the Second Division was set up. Its status within the Scottish football league system league system changed in season 1998–99, when clubs from the top tier (Premier Division) broke away from the Scottish Football League to form the Scottish Premier League. The Second Division was still the third tier of the Scottish league system, but became the second level of the Scottish Football League rather than the third. In 2013, the Scottish Premier League and Scottish Football League merged to form the Scottish Professional Football League, with the third tier becoming known as the Scottish League One.

Scottish Football League Division Three (1923–1926)

 Helensburgh had the most points, whereas Leith Athletic had a better points to match ratio.

Scottish Football League Division C (1946–1955)

Scottish Football League Second Division (1975–2013)

Scottish League One (2013–)

Total wins
34 different clubs (counting reserve teams separately from first teams) have won the third tier of Scottish football. Three clubs (Clyde, Partick Thistle and Rangers) have won the third tier with both their first team and their reserve team.

Clubs participating in the 2022–23 Scottish League One are denoted in bold type.
Clubs no longer active are denoted in italics.

Livingston were known as Meadowbank Thistle between 1974 and 1995
Greenock Morton were known as Morton before 1994
Airdrieonians were known as Airdrie United before 2013

References
Specific

General
 RSSSF – Scotland - Final Tables Third Level 1924-2004
 RSSSF – Scotland - List of 3rd Level Champions

Winners
Winners
League One winners
Winners